Antoine Vestier (1740 – 24 December 1824) was a French miniaturist and painter of portraits, born at Avallon in Burgundy, who trained in the atelier of Jean-Baptiste Pierre. He showed his work at the Salon de la Correspondance, Paris, before being admitted (agréé) to the Académie Royale de Peinture et de Sculpture in 1785, when a portrait of the painter Gabriel François Doyen, was his morceau de réception.

Among his sitters was the royal cabinet-maker, Jean Henri Riesener (1786, Musée de Versailles).

Further portraits include
The Chevalier de Latude, 1789 (Paris, musée Carnavalet)
Nicolas-Guy Brenet, painter, 1786 (Paris, musée du Louvre)
Jean Thurel, fusilier, 1788; this aged veteran wears three medals, witness to his seventy-two years of service (Tours, musée des Beaux-Arts)
A Chevalier of Malta holding the portrait of the Bailli de Hautefeuille, commander of the Order, 1788 (Dijon, musée des beaux-arts).
François-Joseph Gossec, unknown date.

Vestier was the father of portraitist Marie-Nicole Vestier, wife of miniaturist François Dumont.

Further reading
Sueur, Jean-Claude. Le portraitiste Antoine Vestier (1740-1824), Rueil-Malmaison, 1974. (privately printed)
 Passez, Anne-Marie, with Joseph Baillio and Marie-Christine Maufus. Antoine Vestier, 1740-1824, (Paris: La Bibliothèque des Arts, Fondation Wildenstein) 1989.

References

External links 

1740 births
1824 deaths
People from Avallon
18th-century French painters
French male painters
19th-century French painters
French portrait painters
Portrait miniaturists
19th-century French male artists
18th-century French male artists